Team Valor Stable LLC  is an American Thoroughbred horse racing stable based in Lake Worth, Florida. It was founded by Barry Irwin and Jeff Siegel who create partnerships (syndicates) with racing enthusiasts to race Thoroughbred horses at major racing venues, primarily in North America.

In early July 2007, Barry Irwin acquired the equity position held by Jeff Siegel and changed the name of the operation to Team Valor International.

In keeping with the new name, Team Valor became more internationally focused as Irwin proposed to seek out more excellent stock abroad, having proven earlier that it could be just as lucrative and exciting as finding runners in North America.

In 2011, Team Valor's colt Animal Kingdom, who was also bred by Barry Irwin, won the Kentucky Derby. At the age of five, Team Valor's Animal Kingdom won the world's richest race, The Dubai World Cup, with a total purse of $10 Million.

In the ten years in which North American-based Racing Partnership statistics have been kept, Team Valor International has been the Leading Partnership by number of stakes races won in the years 2009, 2010, 2011, 2012, 2013 and 2018.

International champions
Under the guidance of stable manager Barry Irwin, the racing stable has campaigned 16 International Champions and Highweights:

 Ipi Tombe (Zimbabwe) -- Horse of the Year in Dubai
 Sweet Stream (Italy) -- Top-weighted Staying Mare at age 5 in England
 Animal Kingdom (USA) -- Champion Colt at age 3 in USA, Champion Older Horse in Dubai
 Free At Last (USA) -- Champion Colt at age 2 in Canada
 Added Edge (USA) -- Champion Colt at 2 in Canada 
 Axana (Germany) -- Champion Miler at 3 in Germany
 Becrux (Italy) -- Champion Colt at 2 in Italy 
 Carnadore (South Africa) -- Champion Colt at 2 in South Africa 
 Russian Sage (S. Africa) -- Champion Colt at 3 in South Africa 
 Captain's Lover (S. Africa) -- Champion Filly at 3 in South Africa 
  (S. Africa) -- Champion Filly at 3 in South Africa 
 Technician (France) -- Champion Stayer at 3 in France
 Torgau (Ireland) -- Cartier Racing Award in England, top-weighted 2yo filly in Ireland 
 Star of Cozzene (USA) -- Top-weighted 3yo colt on turf in USA
 Political Ambition (USA) -- Top-weighted 3yo colt on turf in USA
 Prized (USA) -- Top-weighted 3yo colt on turf in USA
 Va Bank (Ire) -- Top-weighted Older Horse in Poland, top-weighted Older Horse in Germany
 Love 'N' Happiness (Brz) -- Champion Filly at 2 in Brazil

Regional champions to race for Team Valor include:

 Prized (USA) -- Horse of the Year and Champion 3yo Colt in Florida 
 Cashier's Dream (USA) -- Horse of the Year in Michigan 
 Thomas Jo (USA) -- Horse of the Year and Champion 3yo in Texas 
 King of the Roxy (USA) -- Horse of the Year and Outstanding 3yo Colt in Ohio 
 Golden Ballet (USA) -- Champion Filly at 3 in California 
 Le Grande Danseur (USA) -- Champion Colt at 2 in New York 
 Royal Pleasure (South Africa) -- Champion Filly at 2 in Kwa-Zulu-Natal region SAF 
 Sally Bowles (South Africa) -- Champion Filly at 2 in Kwa-Zulu-Natal region SAF 
 Stratos (South Africa) -- Champion Older Mare in Highveld region SAF
 Ebony Flyer (South Africa) -- Champion Filly at 3 in Eastern Cape region SAF
 Brave Mary (South Africa) -- Horse of the Year in Kwa-Zulu-Natal region, Champion Filly at 2 in Kwa-Zulu-Natal region (South Africa)
 Anna Pavlova (South Africa) -- Champion Filly at 3 in Kwa-Zulu-Natal region, Champion Filly Sprinter in Kwa-Zulu-Natal region (South Africa)

Team Valor has campaigned 30 individual Grade 1 winners around the globe:

 Animal Kingdom (USA and Dubai)
 Becrux (Italy)
 Capla Temptress (Canada)
 Captain Bodgit (USA)
 Captain's Lover (South Africa)
 Carnadore (South Africa)
 Cashier's Dream (USA)
 Ebony Flyer (South Africa)
 Euro Charline (USA)
 Gitano Hernando (USA)
 Golden Ballet (USA)
 Gypsy's Warning (USA)
 Ipi Tombe (Zimbabwe and South Africa)
  (South Africa and Hong Kong)
 Little Miss Magic (South Africa)
 Love 'N' Happiness (Brazil)
 Martial Law (Great Britain)
 Oleksandra (USA)
 On Her Toes (South Africa)
 Political Ambition (USA)
 Prized (USA)
 Russian Sage (South Africa)
 Star of Cozzene (USA)
 Stratos (South Africa)
 Summer Soiree (USA)
 Sweet Stream (France)
 Technician (France)
 The Deputy (USA)
 Unbridled Belle (USA)
 Visionaire (USA)

Graded races
International Grade 1 victories earned by Team Valor runners include:

 Allan Robertson Stakes (South Africa) 
 Arlington Million (USA)
 Beldame Stakes (USA)
 The Breeders Cup Turf (USA)
 The Cape Fillies Guineas (South Africa)
 Daily News 2000 Stakes (South Africa)
 Del Mar Oaks (USA)
 Dubai Duty Free Stakes (United Arab Emirates)
 Dubai World Cup (United Arab Emirates)
 Audemars Piquet Queen Elizabeth II Cup (Hong Kong)
 Empress Club Stakes (South Africa) (twice) 
 Florida Derby (USA)
 Golden Medallion (South Africa) 
 Goodwood Handicap (USA)
 Hollywood Derby (USA)
 Hollywood Invitational Turf Handicap (USA)
 Gran Premio Immensity (Brazil)
 Jaipur Handicap (USA)
 Kentucky Derby (USA)
 King's Bishop Stakes (USA)
 Las Virgenes Stakes (USA)
 Majorca Stakes (South Africa)
 Man o'War Stakes (USA)
 Matriarch Stakes (USA)
 Molson Export Million (Canada)
 Natalma Stakes (Canada)
 Prix Royal-Oak (France)
 SA Fillies Classic (South Africa) (twice)
 SA Fillies Sprint (South Africa)
 San Luis Rey Stakes (USA)
 Santa Anita Derby (USA)
 Santa Anita Handicap (USA)
 Santa Anita Oaks (USA)
 Spinaway Stakes (USA)
 Prix Vermeille (France)
 Woodbine Mile (Canada)
 Woolavington Stakes (South Africa)

Racing Around the Globe
Barry Irwin's stable, Team Valor International, is a global venture. The stable has campaigned winners in the following locales:

 America
 Canada
 England
 Ireland
 France
 Germany
 Italy
 Austria
 Switzerland
 Dubai
 Saudi Arabia
 South Africa
 Hong Kong
 Japan
 Brazil
 Uruguay
 South Korea

References

American racehorse owners and breeders
Owners of Kentucky Derby winners